Labracetabulum is a genus of trematodes in the family Opecoelidae. Cribb's review of Labracetabulum synonymised it with Prolabria Reimer, 1987, which  led to the synonymisation of P. monocentris Reimer, 1987 to L. monocentris (Reimer, 1987) Cribb, 2005.

Morphology
Species of Labracetabulum are distinguished by the lack of a cirrus-sac, the use of separate ani proximal to the excretory pore to open the caeca, and distinct anterior and posterior lips on the ventral sucker.

Species
Labracetabulum gephyroberici Reimer, 1987
Labracetabulum monocentris (Reimer, 1987) Cribb, 2005

References

Opecoelidae
Plagiorchiida genera